Muhammad Ali Akhlaqi is an ethnic Hazara politician from Afghanistan, who was the representative of the people of Ghazni province in the 16th term of Afghan Parliament.

Early life 
Muhammad Ali Akhlaqi was born in 1971 in Malistan district of Ghazni province. In 2002, he graduated from Imam Khomeini University in Iran with a master's degree in sociology.

See also 
 List of Hazara people

References 

Living people
1971 births
Hazara politicians
People from Ghazni Province